Asten may refer to:

 Asten, Austria, municipality in Austria
 Asten, Netherlands, municipality in the Netherlands